The Rothmans Torquay Tournament was grass court tennis event founded in 1879. In 1881 it was known as the Torquay Lawn Tennis Tournmament. that was held at the Winter Garden, Torquay, Devon, England.It contiuned under that name until after World War II when it was known as the Torquay Open Lawn Tennis Tournament though to the 1960s. In 1971 the tobacco company Rothmans International took over sponsorship of the event until 1974 when their sponsorship ended. 

This tournament though no longer part of the international tour is still being staged today as the Torbay Open Tennis Tournament.

History
A Torquay Tennis Tournament was founded as early as 1879. In 1881 the event was known as the Torquay Lawn Tennis Tournmament  and played at the Winter Garden, Torquay, Devon, England. In 1887 it became an open event for the women to play for the first time. The tournament was held annually, with the exception of world war's one and two. Following the second world war the tournament known by then as the Torquay Open Lawn Tennis Tournament at least upto 1960. In 1971 Rothmans International took over sponsorship of the event and it was renamed as the Rothmans Torquay Tournament until 1974, when Rothman's pulled out of sports sponsorship and this tournament ended as part international world wide tour. It is still being staged today as the Torbay Open Tennis Tournament.

References

External links
 Torquay Tennis Club

Grass court tennis tournaments
Defunct tennis tournaments in the United Kingdom
Recurring sporting events established in 1879
1879 establishments in England
1974 disestablishments in England